"Silly Games" is a song written by Dennis Bovell that was first released in 1979 as a single by Janet Kay. The single was a hit not only in the UK, where it reached number 2 that summer, but throughout Europe. Kay's appearance singing on Top of the Pops made it the first lover's rock tune on BBC Television's flagship popular music show. The song appeared again in 1990 as a re-recording, billed as by Lindy Layton featuring Janet Kay, which reached number 22 in the charts. A remix version of Kay's original recording spent three weeks in the UK Singles Chart, peaking at number 62.

Song background
Dennis Bovell has described "Silly Games" as "the story of a bold young lady proposing to a young man. C'mon, we've been giving each other the eye. I know you like me. Stop playing games. In 1978, when I wrote it, almost always the man made the first move." Explaining how he approached the composition, Bovell says: "There was an advert for Memorex where Ella Fitzgerald sang a note and broke a glass, and I wanted a song with a note like that; little girls always try to sing a high note, so when I wrote ‘Silly Games’ and put that high note in there, it meant that every female in the dance would try and sing that note." Now considered an anthem of its genre, "Silly Games" has been called "probably the most popular of the lover's rock songs from the '70s". Bovell has said: "...it was a song constructed with a verse and a chorus and a bridge and a 'tickling piece' at the end and an intro to catch you so you would have to sit up and listen to what was coming next.... To this day, that song is still on the radio constantly. But that song, it was constructed to be a hit."

Dennis Bovell played guitar, bass and synthesizer, Drummie Zeb from Aswad played the drums and Janet Kay sang.

The song features prominently in Steve McQueen's film Lovers Rock, the second film in his 2020 anthology series Small Axe. As The New York Times states: "The lovesick kiss-off 'Silly Games' and its indelible high note play a pivotal part" in the film, and Bovell has a cameo role.

Critical reception 
The Guardian said, "Everything about "Silly Games" is perfect: its gently rolling rhythm, its beautiful melody, Dennis Bovell's subtle production, Kay's vocal that goes from understated to indelible."

Lindy Layton version
English singer Lindy Layton debuted as a solo singer with her version of "Silly Games" in 1990. It features Janet Kay and peaked at number 22 on the UK Singles Chart.

Critical reception
Dave Jennings from Melody Maker wrote, "The song is tender and lovely, as anyone who remembers Janet Kay's sensual original will know. Producers Martin Philips and Norman Cook have conjured up a fine, sturdy, shuffling rhythm track."

Charts

Tricky version
The British trip-hop musician Tricky included the song on his 2014 album Adrian Thaws, featuring vocalist mTirzah in a version characterised as "low-slung soul".

References

External links
 "Janet Kay - Silly Games". YouTube

1979 singles
1990 debut singles
1979 songs
Arista Records singles
Lovers rock songs
Songs written by Dennis Bovell